Denver International Airport , locally known as DIA, is an international airport in the Western United States, primarily serving metropolitan Denver, Colorado, as well as the greater Front Range Urban Corridor. At , it is the largest airport in the Western Hemisphere by land area and the second largest on Earth, behind King Fahd International Airport. The airport is  driving distance from Downtown Denver,  farther than the former Stapleton International Airport, the facility DEN replaced: the airport land was originally part of Adams County until the construction of the airport in 1995, and is actually located in between Commerce City and Aurora with the Southwest side connecting strip of neighborhoods (on the route of Pena Blvd) being the only connection with the rest of the city of Denver: many airport-related services, such as hotels, are located in Aurora.

Opened in 1995, Denver currently serves 25 different airlines offering non-stop service to over 215 destinations throughout the Americas, Europe, and Asia; it was the fourth airport in the U.S. to exceed 200 destinations. The airport is a major hub for both United Airlines and Frontier Airlines and the largest operating base for Southwest Airlines. With over 35,000 employees, the airport is the largest employer in Colorado. The airport is located on the western edge of the Great Plains and within sight of the Front Range of the Rocky Mountains.

In both 2021 and 2022, DEN was the third busiest airport in the world as well as the third busiest airport in the United States by passenger traffic; DEN has been among the top 20 busiest airports in the world every year since 2000.

History
Denver has traditionally been home to one of the busier airports in the United States because its midcontinent location was ideal for an airline hub. Several airlines, notably United Airlines and Continental Airlines, were hubbed at the former Stapleton International Airport, helping make it the sixth-busiest airport in the country by the 1960s. But Stapleton was cramped, with little room to add additional flights and with runways too close together, leading to long waits in bad weather that would cause nationwide travel disruptions.

From 1980 to 1983, the Denver Regional Council of Governments investigated areas for a new area airport north and east of Denver. Meanwhile, in 1983, Federico Peña was elected mayor of Denver, campaigning on a plan to expand Stapleton onto Rocky Mountain Arsenal lands. The plan had broad support, but leaders in nearby Adams County threatened to sue over noise concerns.

Eventually Peña struck a deal: Adams County leaders would rally citizens to back a plan for Denver to annex  of the county to build an airport away from established neighborhoods. In 1988, Adams County voters approved the annexation. The proposal was met with some skepticism because of its location:  from the heart of the city. But seeing the importance of a Denver air hub to the national transportation system, the federal government put $500 million (equivalent to $ billion ) toward the new airport. The rest of the cost would be financed by bonds, to be repaid with fees on airlines. Ground was broken in September 1989.

Two years later, Mayor Wellington Webb inherited the megaproject, which at that time was scheduled to open on October 29, 1993. At the time United was refusing to move to the new airport over the high proposed fees. The airline finally relented under the condition that the airport include an automated baggage system.

Construction delays pushed opening day back, first to December 1993, then to March 1994. By September 1993, delays due to a millwright strike and other events meant opening day was pushed back again, to May 1994.

In April 1994, the city invited reporters to observe the first test of the new automated baggage system. Reporters were treated to scenes of clothing and other personal effects scattered beneath the system's tracks and carts that would often toss the luggage right off the system. After the embarrassing preview, the mayor cancelled the planned May opening. The baggage system continued to be a maintenance hassle and was finally terminated in September 2005, with traditional baggage handlers manually handling cargo and passenger luggage.

DEN finally replaced Stapleton on February 28, 1995, 16 months behind schedule and at a cost of $4.8 billion (equivalent to $ billion ), nearly $2 billion over budget ($ billion ). The construction employed 11,000 workers. United Airlines Flight 1062 to Kansas City International Airport was the first to depart DIA and United Flight 1474 from Colorado Springs Airport was the first to arrive at the new airport.

The airport was closed for more than 45 hours, stranding thousands. Following this, the airport invested heavily in new snow-removal equipment that has led to a dramatic reduction in runway occupancy times to clear snow, down from an average of 45 minutes in 2006 to just 15 minutes in 2014.

After shunning DEN for over a decade due to high fees, Southwest Airlines entered the airport in January 2006 with 13 daily flights. Southwest has since rapidly expanded and is now the airport's second-largest carrier after United.

In the 2010s, a transit center and hotel were added to the main Jeppesen Terminal. The hotel opened on November 19, 2015, and on April 22, 2016, commuter rail trains started operating between the airport and Denver Union Station on RTD's A Line.

On September 9, 2015, a political campaign was launched by Mayor Michael Hancock to radically expand commercial development at DIA, previously prohibited by intergovernmental agreement between Denver and Adams County. The changes to the agreement were approved by both Denver and Adams County voters in November 2015.

In 2018, work began on a major interior renovation and reconfiguration to the entire Jeppesen Terminal including the beginning phases of construction to relocate two out of the three TSA security checkpoints from the Great Hall on Level 5 to Level 6 (East & West) while simultaneously updating and consolidating airline ticket counters/check-in for all airlines. Eventually, both pre- and post-security gathering and leisure areas will be incorporated into the spaces where both expansive TSA security areas on Level 5 are currently located.  The third TSA security checkpoint currently accessible via the Concourse A bridge is expected to be removed once the new Level 6 security areas are completed.  The renovation and reconfiguration will bring back the original intent and use of the Great Hall as a large commons area for airport patrons and visitors to enjoy. First phases of completion - including updated check-in and baggage drop counters for United & Southwest Airlines as well as visual and facility updates to parts of the terminal - began in late 2020 and progressively continue to this day.  This phased terminal project is expected to be completed by 2028.

Additionally in 2018, work commenced on a major gate expansion to all three concourses with 12 new gates being added to A (including several single and double-jetway gates with direct access to U.S. Customs and Border Protection), 11 to B, and 16 to C, for a total of 39 new gates. Following the completion of this project, United Airlines has leased 24 additional gates on both A and B (bringing its total gate count at DEN to around 90), as well as build a new United Club in A and expand their existing clubs in B. Southwest Airlines leased 16 of the new gates in C bringing its total gate count at DEN to 40, which is SWA's largest gate count at any single airport. As of November 2022, all new gates in A-West, B-West, B-East and C-East are in use and new retail and restaurant tenants will continue to open through 2023 as well as new art commissioned and installed through 2025.  Additionally, all existing way-finding signs, flight information display systems and gate signs are expected to be replaced in the coming years matching what is found at the new gates and within the renovated portions of the terminal.  When both the ongoing terminal and concourse projects are completed, the airport will be able to handle upwards of 100 million passengers per year.

In 2021, the airport experienced a notable failure of the train system. In response, a request for information from the private sector was issued to analyze options to possibly supplement the train system in the future.

In 2022, a committee was formed to support efforts to establish flights between Denver and Africa.

In August 2022, DEN broke ground on an additional gate expansion project that will bring a total of 14 ground loaded gates to the east end of Concourse A to be used solely for Frontier Airlines operations. This will be a gain of four gates for Frontier once completed. Currently there are several ground loaded gates in operation at this location which were constructed back in 2018 for United's temporary regional operations while a new and additional regional wing was being constructed onto the east end of Concourse B. The new United Concourse B regional wing opened in late 2022 and United has now mostly vacated the A regional wing making way for Frontier to move in. The expanded Concourse A wing for Frontier is expected to open by mid-2024.

In November 2022 it was announced that the airport will start construction in mid to late 2023 on a new 'Center of Equity and Excellence in Aviation' which will help underserved communities and prepare current and future employees for a career in aviation.  The CEEA will be located directly below the Westin Hotel and DEN Plaza and is expected to open in late 2024 or early 2025.

Facilities

The airport is  driving distance from Downtown Denver, which is  farther away than Stapleton International Airport, the airport DIA replaced. The distant location was chosen to avoid aircraft noise affecting developed areas, to accommodate a generous runway layout that would not be compromised by blizzards, and to allow for future expansion.

The  of land occupied by the airport is more than one and a half times the size of Manhattan. DIA occupies the largest amount of commercial airport land area in North America, by a great extent. The land was transferred from Adams County to Denver after a 1989 vote, increasing the city's size by 50 percent and bifurcating the western portion of the neighboring county. Similarly, the A Line rail service connecting the airport with downtown Denver has two intervening stations in Aurora.

Terminal
DIA has one terminal, named The Jeppesen Terminal after aviation safety pioneer Elrey Borge Jeppesen, and three midfield concourses, spaced far apart. The three midfield concourses have a total of 179 gates in operation as of late 2022. Concourse A is accessible via a pedestrian bridge directly from the terminal building, as well as via the underground train system that services all three concourses. For access to Concourses B and C, passengers must utilize the train. All international arrivals without border pre-clearance are processed in Concourse A; this concourse also has 4 3-jetway international gates that can support ADG Group VI aircraft such as an Airbus A380 and a Boeing 747-8, the two largest commercial aircraft in the world.

Concourse A has 60 gates, including several ground level boarding gates and several double jetway gates.
Concourse B has 72 gates, including four double jetway gates and several regional gates.
Concourse C has 47 gates, including four ground level boarding gates.

Art and aesthetics

The Jeppesen Terminal's internationally recognized peaked roof, designed by Fentress Bradburn Architects, resembles snow-capped mountains and evokes the early history of Colorado when Native American teepees were located across the Great Plains. The catenary steel cable system, similar to the Brooklyn Bridge design, supports the fabric roof. DIA is also known for a pedestrian bridge connecting the terminal to Concourse A that allows travelers to walk from the main Terminal to Concourse A, while viewing planes taxiing beneath them. It offers views of the Rocky Mountains to the west and the high plains to the east.

Both during construction and after opening, DIA has set aside a portion of its construction and operation budgets for art. The corridor from the main terminal and Concourse A frequently displays temporary art exhibits. A number of public artworks are present in the underground train that links the main terminal with concourses, including art pieces from the history of Colorado.

The airport features a bronze statue of Denver native Jack Swigert by Loveland, Colorado artist George Lundeen in Concourse B. Swigert flew on Apollo 13 as Command Module Pilot, and was elected to the House of Representatives in 1982, but died of cancer before he was sworn in. The statue is dressed in an A7L pressure suit, and is posed holding a gold-plated helmet. It is a duplicate of a statue placed at the United States Capitol in 1997. George Lundeen is also the sculptor of "The Aviator", a monumental bronze sculpture of Elrey Borge Jeppesen, for whom the terminal is named.

Denver International Airport has four murals by the Chicano artist Leo Tanguma. "Children of the World Dream of Peace" is in two-parts. The first depicts the horrors of war, with a man in a gas-mask brandishing a saber. The second, larger part shows this man toppled, and smiling children from many nations making swords into plowshares; Tanguma explains this is a reference to the Book of Micah: "and they shall beat their swords into plowshares--nation shall not lift up sword against nation, neither shall they learn war any more." Per Denver Public Art, "Children of the World Dream of Peace" is a powerful mural expressing the artist's desire to abolish violence in society. One section of the piece speaks to the tragedy and devastation of war and its impact on humanity. The mural then moves on to images of smiling children, dressed in traditional folk costumes from around the world, celebrating peace prevailing over war." "In Peace and Harmony With Nature" is also in two parts; Denver Public Art explains that "The first half of the mural shows children displaying great sadness over the destruction and extinction of life, as the second half of the artwork depicts humanity coming together to rehabilitate and celebrate nature." Tanguma confirms this was his intent.

In March 2019, the airport unveiled an animated, talking gargoyle in the middle of one of the concourses. The gargoyle interacted with passengers and joked about the supposed conspiracies connected to the airport.

Blue Mustang, by El Paso-born artist Luis Jiménez, was one of the earliest public art commissions for Denver International Airport in 1993. The  sculpture is a bright blue cast-fiberglass sculpture of a horse with glowing red eyes located between the inbound and outbound lanes of Peña Boulevard. Jiménez was killed in 2006 at age 65 while creating the sculpture when a part of it fell on him and severed an artery in his leg. At the time of his death, Jiménez had completed painting the head of the mustang. Blue Mustang was completed by others, and unveiled at the airport on February 11, 2008. The statue has been the subject of considerable controversy, and has acquired the nickname Blucifer for its demonic appearance. The sculpture has been defended and disparaged by many people.

Ground transportation

The Regional Transportation District (RTD) operates the A Line rail service between DIA and Denver Union Station in downtown Denver, making the 37 minute trip about every 15 minutes. RTD also operates an airport express bus service called skyRide between Arapahoe County or Boulder and DIA. There is also hourly service to Thornton on RTD route 104L, a limited stop bus. The airport is also served by two commuter routes with just a few runs per day: RTD route 145X to Brighton and 169L to Aurora.

Scheduled bus service is also available to points such as Fort Collins, and van services stretch into Nebraska, Wyoming, and Colorado summer and ski resort areas. Amtrak offers a Fly-Rail plan for ticketing with United Airlines for trips into scenic areas in the Western U.S. via a Denver stopover.

The airport is connected to the I-70 and Denver via the Peña Boulevard freeway. A number of car rental companies are located at the airport, providing courtesy shuttle services from Jeppesen Terminal Level 5, Island 4, to their parking areas.

Airlines and destinations

Passenger

Cargo

Statistics

Top destinations

Annual traffic

Airline market share

Accidents and incidents

 On February 16, 2007, 14 aircraft suffered windshield failures within a three-and-a-half-hour period at the airport. A total of 26 windshields on these aircraft failed.
 On December 20, 2008, a Continental Airlines Boeing 737-500 operating as Flight 1404 to Houston–Intercontinental Airport veered off the left side of runway 34R and caught fire during its takeoff roll at DIA. There was no snow or ice on the runway, however there were  crosswinds at the time of the accident. On July 13, 2010, the NTSB published that the probable cause of this accident was the captain's cessation of right rudder input, which was needed to maintain directional control of the airplane. Of the 115 people on board, at least 38 sustained injuries, at least two critically.
 On April 3, 2012, an ExpressJet Embraer ERJ-145, registration N15973, operating as Flight UA/EV-5912 from Peoria, IL to Denver, was landing on 34R when the aircraft hit the approach lights and stopped on the runway. Smoke developed inside the aircraft and passengers were evacuated onto the runway. One passenger was taken to a hospital for treatment of his injuries.
 On February 20, 2021, United Airlines Flight 328, a Boeing 777-200 that was on its way from Denver to Honolulu, Hawaii, suffered engine damage just after takeoff and had to return to Denver International Airport. Debris from the damaged engine fell on a neighborhood in Broomfield, a city near the airport. The damaged airplane landed safely on runway 26 and no injuries were reported.

See also

 Busiest airports in the United States by international passenger traffic
 Busiest airports in the United States by total passenger boardings
 List of airports in the Denver area
 List of the busiest airports in the United States
 List of longest runways
 Megaprojects and Risk: An Anatomy of Ambition
 World's busiest airports by passenger traffic
 World's busiest airports by traffic movements
 World's busiest airports by cargo traffic
 World's busiest airports by international passenger traffic
 List of tallest air traffic control towers in the United States

References

87. ^ Addam,James (April 7, 2022) "Budget Travel Tips for a Backpacker to Lisbon" tapportugalairlinse.com.

External links

 Denver International Airport, official site

 
 Airportag, kiosk located in the airport in 2019  
 Denver International Airport aviation weather 

 
Airports in Colorado
Tensile membrane structures
Transportation buildings and structures in Denver
Airports established in 1995
1995 establishments in Colorado